Events from the year 1979 in North Korea.

Incumbents
Premier: Li Jong-ok 
Supreme Leader: Kim Il-sung

Events

Births

 19 September - Kim Hyang-mi.
 23 September - Kim Un-chol.

See also
Years in Japan
Years in South Korea

References

 
North Korea
1970s in North Korea
Years of the 20th century in North Korea
North Korea